Manoucher Yektai (December 22, 1921 – November 19, 2019) was an Iranian-born American artist. He is associated with New York School art movement.

Early life and education
Born in Tehran, Iran, Yektai dropped out of Tehran University without obtaining a degree. Between 1945 and 1947, he studied with Amédée Ozenfant in Paris, and later in New York City. From 1946 to 1947, he studied at the École des Beaux-Arts, and at the atelier of André Lhote. From 1947 to 1948, he studied at the Art Students League of New York.

Career
Yektai has many works in North American and European collections and museums, including the Museum of Modern Art, the Hirshhorn Museum and Sculpture Garden, San Francisco Museum of Modern Art, and numerous private collections such as the Yellowstone Art Museum.

Personal life 
Yektai became a naturalized U.S. citizen in 1959. He died at the age of 97 on November 19, 2019, in New York City.

Selected solo exhibitions

 1949: Woodstock, New York
 1951, 1952, 1953: Grace Borgenicht Gallery, Inc., New York City
 1956: American Associated Artists, New York City
 1957, 1958, 1961, 1962, 1964: Poindexter Gallery, New York City
 1959: Felix Landau Gallery Los Angeles County, California
 1960,1961, 1963, 1965: Semia Huber Gallery, Zürich, Switzerland
 1962: Anderson Meyer Gallery, Paris; Feingarten Gallery, Chicago, Illinois
 1961, 1962, 1964, 1970: Picadilly Gallery, London, United Kingdom
 1965, 1966, (67: Gertrude Kasle Gallery, Detroit, Michigan
 1966. 1967, 1972, 1973, 1975, 1984, 1996: Elaine Benson Gallery, Bridgehampton, New York
 1977, 1978: Galerie Zand, Teheran, Iran
 1981, 1984: Alex Rosenberg Gallery, New York City
 1988: Paris - New York: Kent Fine Art, Kent, Connecticut

See also
 Islamic art
 Iranian art
 Islamic calligraphy
 List of Iranian artists

References

External links
yektai.com/

Further reading
 Marika Herskovic, American Abstract Expressionism of the 1950s An Illustrated Survey, (New York School Press, 2003.) . p. 362-365
 Marika Herskovic, New York School Abstract Expressionists Artists Choice by Artists, (New York School Press, 2000.) . p. 31; p. 39; p. 382-385

1921 births
2019 deaths
Abstract expressionist artists
20th-century American painters
American male painters
21st-century American painters
Iranian painters
Iranian emigrants to the United States
Modern painters
Painters from New York City
People from Tehran
École des Beaux-Arts alumni
People with acquired American citizenship
20th-century American male artists